Rebecca or Rebeca Martins Garcia (born 1973) is a Brazilian economist and politician. She represented Amazonas for the Progressistas party in the 53rd Chamber of Deputies of Brazil (2007-2011) and the 54th Chamber of Deputies of Brazil (2011-2014).

She studied economics at Boston University from 1993 to 1996.

References

1973 births
Living people
21st-century Brazilian women politicians
Brazilian women economists
Brazilian economists
Members of the Chamber of Deputies (Brazil) from Amazonas
Progressistas politicians
Boston University alumni